FAA Order 8110.105A, Simple and Complex Electronic Hardware Approval Guidance, supplements RTCA DO-254() by explaining how FAA aircraft certification staff can use that document "when working on certification projects" and is recommended as a reference for developers applying for certification under DO-254(). A particular focus is on clarification of the application of DO-254 guidance to "simple" custom micro-coded components (for example, ASICs, PLDs, or FPGAs with simple firmware functions installed) as opposed to the more rigorous assurance expected of complex custom micro-coded components. Micro-coded devices are typically presumed to be complex components that cannot be verified through testing alone; however, some applicants have proposed their specific micro-coded device applications as simple components.

Additionally, Order 8110.105 addresses some of the omissions and clarification needs identified by the Certification Authorities Software Team in their position paper, CAST-31, and as such informs hardware developers of interests beyond those presently expressed in DO-254.

Functioning hardware systems and products certified through DO-254() processes range from replaceable electronic boxes, circuit boards within such enclosures, and ASICs, PLDs, or FPGAs placed on such boards. These sorts of hardware can be classified as simple or complex.  With respect to DO-254(), a device is classified as simple if comprehensive inspection or testing alone can demonstrate that it is reasonably free of design defects or errors and has deterministic behavior. A complex device, then, is one that cannot be assessed by comprehensive inspection or testing alone.

For the purposes of aircraft type certification efforts, aircraft system components are designated as software or hardware. Software components are computer programs installed and operating on computers or microcontrollers and are usually subjected to the design assurance processes of RTCA DO-178() when installed in aircraft. DO-254() is applied to the certification of both simple and complex hardware components, particularly inclusive of both simple and complex custom micro-coded components. "A hardware item is considered simple if a comprehensive combination of deterministic tests and analyses can ensure correct functional performance under all foreseeable operating conditions with no anomalous behavior." All other hardware items are considered complex and, since complex hardware items cannot be completely validated by inspection and testing alone, design assurance methodology is required. Advisory Circular 20-152 recognizes the guidance in DO-254 as a suitable means for demonstrating compliance for the use of complex custom micro-coded components within aircraft systems. However, application of DO-254 to simple micro-coded components was not explicitly addressed by that circular.

Initially, applicants and developers were concerned with the apparent ambiguity of DO-254's guidance on simple electronic hardware. That document is largely concerned with the objectives and activities of developing complex electronic hardware. However, it provides only one short paragraph suggesting that a simple hardware item should be configuration controlled and verified, but "extensive documentation is not needed". In response to the concern, CAST-30 Simple Electronic Hardware and RTCA Document DO-254 and EUROCAE Document ED-80 was completed in 2007 to provide clarification to the guidance in DO-254/ED-80 specifically for simple electronic hardware. Following this, FAA Order 8110.105 was released in 2008 to supplement the guidance for both simple and complex electronic hardware, and revised to Revision A in 2017. Three primary chapters are clarification of 
 topics applicable to both simple and complex electronic hardware, 
 topics applicable to complex electronic hardware alone, and 
 topics applicable to simple  electronic hardware alone.

References

External links
 
 Regulations & Policies on the FAA website

Civil aviation in the United States
Federal Aviation Administration